Japanese enka singer Kiyoshi Hikawa has released thirty-eight studio albums, three extended plays (EPs), forty-two singles (including one as a featured artist), eight promotional singles, and twenty-eight video albums. In 2000, Hikawa released "Hakone Hachiri no Hanjirō"  as his debut single. This single reached number eleven on the Oricon Weekly Singles Chart and has sold over a million copies nationwide. His second single "Ōi Okkake Otojirō"  reached the top 10 in Japan and attained a double platinum. His tenth single "Hatsukoi Ressha"  was released in 2005 and earned him his first number one hit, later certificated Gold by Recording Industry Association of Japan (RIAJ). With the huge commercial and critical success as an enka singer, Hikawa is often referred as the "Prince of Enka".

He embarked on his career as a pop rock singer with a release of the single "Genkai Toppa x Survivor", which served as a theme song to the anime television series "Dragon Ball Super". His first J-pop studio album (thirty-fifth overall), Papillon -Bohemian Rhapsody- is planned to be released in June 2020. It includes the single "Genkai Toppa x Survivor" and several promotional singles as well as the cover of "Bohemian Rhapsody" by Queen.

Albums

Studio albums

Karaoke albums

Box sets

Extended plays

Singles

As a lead artist

As a featured artist

Promotional singles

Notes

References

External links
 
 

Discographies of Japanese artists